Kariattil Mar Iousep, alternatively written as Mar Joseph Kariattil, (5 May 1742 – 10 September 1786) was the first native Indian to be appointed as Metropolitan of Kodungalloor (Cranganore) for Syrian Catholics in the territory now comprising Kerala, India.

Joseph Kariattil was born at Alengad, near Aluva in present-day central Kerala. He had his initial religious education at the Seminary at Alangad. Later he was sent to the Propaganda College of Pontifical Urban University, Rome, in 1755 when he was barely 13 years old. There he was ordained as a priest, and he took doctorate in Philosophy, Theology and Canon law from there. He was the first Indian national in history to receive multiple doctoral degrees in 18th century. Before 1765 he also authored, under the pen-name of Giuseppe Chariati Indiano, a grammar of the Malayalam language in Portuguese, preserved in the Bibliotheca Nazionale in Rome. He returned to India in 1766. He was then appointed as a Malpan at Alangad Malpanate Seminary.

Kariattil Malpan took great efforts for the reunion of the Saint Thomas Christians (also known as Syrian Christians or Mar Thoma Nazranis) who had split following the Coonen Cross Oath. It was only by the efforts of Rev Malpan Joseph Kariattil and prominent Nazrani laity leader Thachil Mathu Tharakan the bishop of Varapuzha apostolic vicariate bishop Francis De Sales, who pleaded to Malpan for help was able to get settled in Alangad Church in year 1776.   On 18 March 1777, the bishop of puthenkoor Jacobite faction Mar Thoma VI met with Mar Joseph Kariattil to discuss about the reunification of puthenkoor with pazhayakoor and to be part of Catholic family. He made the historic journey to Rome in 1778 together with Paremmakkal Thoma Kathanar to represent the matter with the church authorities there. He met the Queen of Portugal and royal patron of padroado Maria Francesca (Maria I) and submitted an official request in August 1779. The padroado missionaries were totally against reunification of Nazranis and propaganda missionaries didn't promote either. She and authorities of Portugal were really impressed with the humility, personality, religious zeal and intellect of Kariattil Joseph Malpan and hence he was appointed as the Archbishop of Kodungalloor at Lisbon on 16 July 1782. On 17 February 1783 he was consecrated as Archbishop of Cranganore (Kodungalloor) by Emeritus Archbishop of Goa Mar Francisco De Abasouda, Bishop of Macau Mar Alexandreous and Bishop of Mayya Mar Warthulma at Sao Bento monastery church in Lisbon.  On 16 December 1782 Pope Pius VI confirmed his appointment by Queen as Metropolitan Archbishop of Archdiocese of Kodungalloor, thus imprinting in the history of Archdiocese as the first native Archbishop of Mar Thoma Nazranis of Malankara. On 17 March 1783 he revived the sacred Pallium of Metropolitan Archbishop from Pope Pius VI.   At the same time he also received all the privileges and authority to unite Mar Thoma VI and puthenkoor faction to Catholic Church. However, on his way back to India, he died at Goa on 10 September 1786. He was initially buried there and later his mortal remains were transferred to Alangad and were re-interred at St. Mary's Syro-Malabar Catholic Church, Alangad in 1961.

He is the author of two books, viz. Vedatharkkam (Dialectics on Theology) (1768) and Noticias do Reino do Malabar (1780).

He had also issued an official Letter of Archbishop on 16 July 1783.

See also 
 Syro-Malabar Catholic Church
 List of Syro-Malabar Catholics
 Timeline of the Syro-Malabar Catholic Church
 Christianity in India
 Saint Thomas Christians

External links

References 
 Mar Joseph Kariattil
 St Thomas Christian Encyclopaedia of India – Edited by George Menachery, Vol.2 (1973).
 History of Christianity in India – Mundadan, A. Mathias (1984).
 Indian Church History Classics,Vol 1, Ed. George Menachery: The Nazranies (1998).
 Vathamaanappusthakam, Thomas Paremakkal (Malayalam) Various Editions. Eng. Tr. by Placid Podipara, Rome.
Sanghasmrithi(Vol II). Nazrani Pazhama(Part-1). Author: Dr Ignatious Payyapilly (2019).

Syro-Malabar Catholic Archbishops of Ernakulam-Angamaly
18th-century Roman Catholic archbishops in India
People from Aluva
1786 deaths
1742 births
Syro-Malabar archbishops
18th-century Indian scholars